Joel Crawford is an American storyboard artist and director best known for his work on several DreamWorks Animation films, including The Croods: A New Age (2020) and Puss in Boots: The Last Wish (2022).

Career 
In 2006, Joel Crawford joined DreamWorks Animation, where he served as a story artist on Shrek Forever After, Rise of the Guardians, the Kung Fu Panda trilogy, and Bee Movie. In October 2017, Crawford signed on to direct The Croods: A New Age, replacing both Kirk DeMicco and Chris Sanders as director. In November 2017, Crawford directed Trolls Holiday, a half-hour Christmas-themed spinoff of the 2016 film Trolls. In March 2021, Crawford replaced Bob Persichetti as director of the 2022 film Puss in Boots: The Last Wish.

Filmography

Accolades

References

External links 
 

American animated film directors
American animators
American male voice actors
American storyboard artists
California Institute of the Arts alumni
DreamWorks Animation people
Living people
Place of birth missing (living people)
Year of birth missing (living people)